Helcystogramma flavifuscum is a moth in the family Gelechiidae. It was described by Hou-Hun Li and Hui Zhen in 2011. It is found in Guangxi, China.

The wingspan is about 10.5 mm. The forewings are greyish brown with a yellowish-brown metallic lustre. The area along and below the fold is yellowish brown and the costal margin has two short white streaks. There are two fasciae terminally. The hindwings are grey.

References

Moths described in 2011
flavifuscum
Moths of Asia